is a former Japanese football player.

Club statistics

References

External links

J. League

1983 births
Living people
Shobi University alumni
Association football people from Tokyo
Japanese footballers
J2 League players
Japan Football League players
Thespakusatsu Gunma players
AC Nagano Parceiro players
Association football forwards